Hazel Felleman (1884 - April 29, 1975 ) was an American editor. She was the editor of New York Times Book Review Notes and Queries for 15 years, until 1955. She edited The Best Loved Poems of the American People (1936) and  Poems That Live Forever (1965).  Both books have remained in print and have sold over one million copies.

Life and work
Felleman began working at the New York Times in 1905, as a teenager. She started in the Times Tower Building for $10 a week, dusting books. She then progressed to the position of secretary to the editor of The Book Review, until 1944. Along side her secretarial role, she edited Notes and Queries at the newspaper from 1922. In 1943 she took on this editorial role full time. She was often asked to track down obscure lines from forgotten poems. She used her scores of reference books and her detective skills to winkle out the answers and publish them. "She gained reputation as an obscure‐rhyme detective" and in 1936 published her first anthology of poems.  The Best Loved Poems of the American People was printed by Doubleday in the middle of the Great Depression. Felleman wrote in the introduction:
"In the compilation of this book I have drawn on my experience as editor of the Queries and Answers page of the New York Times Book Review over a period of fifteen years. The majority of inquiries that I receive are for favorite poems, and since not a day passes that does not bring to my desk a large sheaf of letters from all parts of the country, it is only natural that I have learned something of the poetry preferences of the American people. I have used this knowledge rather than my own personal liking in the selection of these poems; but I feel free to say that there are few of the poems that I would not have included myself."

Felleman married Lawyer Henry Powell, a lawyer (d.1953). She died on April 30, 1975, at the Beacon Hotel, Broadway at 74th Street, New York.   She was survived by grandchildren and great-grandchildren.

References

Further reading
The Best Loved Poems of the American People (1936) Ed. Hazel Felleman, Doubleday
Poems That Live Forever (1965) Ed. Hazel Felleman, Doubleday

External links
Obituary of Felleman "Hazel Felleman, Queries Editor For Times Book Review, Dead". New York Times

American editors
1884 births
1975 deaths
People from New York City
The New York Times people